Danny Farrar (born 2 April 1968) is an Australian former professional rugby league footballer who played for the Penrith Panthers and the Warrington Wolves.

Farrar started his career in the lower grades at Parramatta, having played his juniors for the local Seven Hills club.

Debuting for Penrith in 1992, Farrar played first-grade for six seasons, mostly as hooker. He was a member of the Penrith side which competed in the 1997 Super League finals series.

From 1998 to 2000 he played for Warrington, after he had made an impression on the coach when Penrith defeated the English club at the 1997 World Club Championship. For much of his time at Warrington he played as club captain.

References

External links
Danny Farrar at Rugby League project

1968 births
Living people
Australian rugby league players
Australian expatriate sportspeople in England
Penrith Panthers players
Warrington Wolves captains
Warrington Wolves players
Rugby league players from Sydney
Rugby league hookers